Team Foxcatcher is a 2016 documentary film directed by Jon Greenhalgh telling the story of billionaire John du Pont's involvement in the shaping of the US Olympic Wrestling Team by building expensive training facilities on his home property, called 'Foxcatcher'. For Dave Schultz, the United States' most successful wrestler at the time, loyalty to John du Pont would eventually cost him his life.

Cast 
 Dan Chaid
 John du Pont
 Dave Schultz
 Nancy Schultz
 Valentin Yordanov

References

External links
 
 
 

2016 documentary films
2016 films
Netflix original documentary films
2010s English-language films
English-language Netflix original films